Edith Lucy Granger (8 October 1869 - 17 September 1957), later Edith Granger Hawkes, was an American poet, writer and indexer.  She was editor of 1904's The Granger's Index to Poetry and Recitations (now known as The Columbia Granger's Index to Poetry), a standard library reference of the twentieth and twenty-first century.

Life

Works

See also
  Granger's Index to Poetry and Recitations (1904)

References

External links
 Edith Granger Project

American writers
California postmasters
1869 births
1957 deaths